The 1929 Saint Mary's Gaels football team was an American football team that represented Saint Mary's College of California during the 1929 college football season.  In their ninth season under head coach Slip Madigan, the Gaels compiled an 8–0–1 record, shut out eight of nine opponents, and outscored all opponents by a combined total of 198 to 6.  The Gaels' victories included a 24–0 besting of UCLA, a 54–0 besting of Nevada, and a 31–6 victory over Oregon. The lone setback was a scoreless tie with California.

Two Saint Mary's players were selected by the United Press as first-team members of the 1929 All-Pacific Coast football team: halfback Stennett and tackle George Ackerman.

Schedule

References

Saint Mary's
Saint Mary's Gaels football seasons
College football undefeated seasons
Saint Mary's Gaels football